Zenia Corrales Jiménez (born 1989), is a Mexican chess player. She earned the title of Woman International Master in 2011.

Chess career
She qualified for the Women's Chess World Cup 2021, where she was defeated 2-0 by Leya Garifullina in the first round.

References

External links

Zenia Corrales Jiménez chess games at 365Chess.com

1989 births
Living people
Mexican female chess players
Chess Woman International Masters
Chess Olympiad competitors